List of Canadian ambassadors to Albania. On 10 September 1987, it was announced that Albania and Canada had established diplomatic relations, and, as of that date, the two countries agreed to exchange diplomatic representatives on a non-resident basis at the level of Ambassador when mutually convenient.

Notes 

 Canadian diplomats to Albania

Albania
Lists of ambassadors to Albania